Deltobotys is a genus of moths of the family Crambidae.

Species
Deltobotys brachypteralis (Hampson, 1913)
Deltobotys citrodoxa (Meyrick, 1936)
Deltobotys galba Munroe, 1964

References

Pyraustinae
Crambidae genera
Taxa named by Eugene G. Munroe